This article contains information about the literary events and publications of 1791.

Events
May 16 – James Boswell's Life of Samuel Johnson is published in 2 volumes in London on the 28th anniversary of their first meeting.
September 10 – The Scottish poet and exciseman Robert Burns moves to Dumfries.
unknown dates
Chinese writer and publisher Gao E and his partner Cheng Weiyan claim to have discovered Cao Xueqin's lost novel Dream of the Red Chamber.
The English poet Samuel Taylor Coleridge begins his course at Jesus College, Cambridge. He marks his transfer from Christ's Hospital school by composing the poem "On Quitting School".

New books

Fiction
Cao Xueqin (曹雪芹) and others – Dream of the Red Chamber (紅樓夢, first printed edition)
Jean-Baptiste Louvet de Couvrai – Émilie de Varmont
Elizabeth Inchbald – A Simple Story
Ann Radcliffe – The Romance of the Forest
Susanna Rowson – Charlotte, a Tale of Truth
Marquis de Sade – Justine ou Les Malheurs de la vertu
Charlotte Turner Smith – Celestina

Drama
Antoine-Vincent Arnault – Marius à Minturne
 Thomas Holcroft – The School for Arrogance
Elizabeth Inchbald – Lovers' Vows
John O'Keeffe – Wild Oats

Poetry

Robert Burns – "Tam o' Shanter"
Erasmus Darwin – The Botanic Garden
Christopher Smart – The Poems of the late Christopher Smart

Non-fiction
James Boswell – Life of Samuel Johnson
Olympe de Gouges – Declaration of the Rights of Woman and of the Female Citizen
Isaac D'Israeli – Curiosities of Literature (Volume 1)
Georg Forster – Views from the Lower Rhine (Volume 1)
William Gilpin – Remarks on Forest Scenery and Other Woodland Views (3 volumes)
Thomas Paine – Rights of Man (Part 1)
Petrarch's View of Life (Latin dialogues De remediis utriusque fortunae translated by Susannah Dobson)
Helen Maria Williams – Letters on the French Revolution

Births
January 15 – Franz Grillparzer, Austrian dramatist (died 1872)
March 15 – Charles Knight, English publisher and author (died 1873)
July 5 – Samuel Bailey, English philosopher and author (died 1870)
August 17 – Richard Lalor Sheil, Irish politician, author and orator (died 1851)
September 21 – István Széchenyi, Hungarian politician, writer and diarist (died 1860)
October 26 – Charles Sprague, American poet and banker (died 1875)
December 24 – Eugène Scribe, French dramatist (died 1861)

Deaths
January 11 – William Williams Pantycelyn, Welsh religious writer and hymnist (born 1717)
March 2 – John Wesley, English preacher and religious writer (born 1703)
April 2 – Honoré Gabriel Riqueti, comte de Mirabeau, French revolutionary and writer (born 1749)
April 19 – Richard Price, Welsh moral philosopher and preacher (born 1723)
June 12 – Francis Grose, English antiquary and lexicographer (born c. 1730)
June 30 – Jean-Baptiste Descamps, French writer and painter (born 1714)
July 2 – Søren Abildgaard, Danish naturalist and writer (born 1718)
November 22 – Johann Silberschlag, German theologian (born 1721)

References

 
Years of the 18th century in literature